José Scher Berdichewsky was a prominent army general during the rule of Chilean dictator Augusto Pinochet.

Life
Berdichewsky was born in Santiago, Chile. He spoke Yiddish fluently. He died in Chile in 2000.

Career
Berdishewsky served as acting commander in chief of the Chilean Air Force and was a member of the ruling military junta during the absence abroad of Air Force Commander Gen. Gustavo Leigh. He participated in the coup against Salvador Allende in 1973.

Berdichewsky retired from the military in December 1977. He later served as the ambassador of Chile to Israel from August 13, 1980 to January 1, 1983.

In 1975, Berdichewsky was honored at a dinner held by leaders of the Chilean-Jewish community.

See also
Military dictatorship of Chile (1973–1990)

References

2000 deaths
Ambassadors of Chile to Israel
Chilean Air Force generals
Chilean Ashkenazi Jews
Jewish military personnel
Military dictatorship of Chile (1973–1990)
People from Santiago
Yiddish-speaking people